James O'Brien (24 July 1885 – 24 February 1954) was an Australian rules footballer who played with Essendon in the Victorian Football League (VFL).

Notes

External links 

1885 births
1954 deaths
Australian rules footballers from Melbourne
Essendon Football Club players
People from Port Melbourne